You Know Nothing About Love is the debut extended play by Swedish recording artist Rebstar, released on November 30, 2015. It contains six songs, including the pre-released lead single Reputation.

Track listing

Notes
 "Makaveli & B.I.G." contain a sample of music publication VIBE interview with Tupac Shakur.

Personnel
Album artwork by Rebstar
Engineered by Rebstar, Saint
Mixed and mastered by Guy Joyner

References

External links
 Official stream

2015 debut EPs
Rebstar albums